WNIC (100.3 FM) is a commercial radio station licensed to Dearborn, Michigan and serving the Metro Detroit media market. Owned by iHeartMedia, WNIC broadcasts an adult contemporary radio format. Each year, usually on the first Friday of November, WNIC switches its format to all-Christmas music.

WNIC's studios and offices are located in Farmington Hills. WNIC's transmitter is located near Schoolcraft Avenue and Turner Street in the City of Detroit on the Near West Side.  WNIC broadcasts with an effective radiated power of 32,000 watts from an antenna 600 feet in height.  WNIC is licensed for HD Radio operation and features a Soft AC/oldies format on its HD2 channel from iHeartRadio's "Sunny Radio" channel.

History

WKMH-FM
WNIC signed on the air in December 1946 as WKMH-FM, sister station to 1310 WKMH (now WDTW).  Both stations were, and still are, licensed to Dearborn.  With FM radio still in its early stages, the two stations largely simulcast their programming through the 1970s.

WKNR-FM and Top 40 format
On Halloween 1963, WKMH-AM-FM became WKNR-AM-FM, and legendary Top 40 radio station "Keener 13" was born, beginning a three-and-a-half-year reign at the top of Detroit's radio ratings until it was toppled by CKLW in nearby Windsor, Ontario, in 1967.  WKMH's FM signal at 100.3 chiefly simulcast Keener AM (with automated Top 40 programming during non-simulcast times).  In 1969, inspired by the success of groundbreaking progressive rock station 99.5 WABX (now WYCD), WKMH-FM adopted its own progressive rock sound.  "Uncle" Russ Gibb was the WKNR-FM disc jockey who helped to spread the rumor that Paul McCartney was dead.  According to Gibb, a college student in Ann Arbor called him on the air one Sunday afternoon and explained the theory to him.  The rumor took off from there and generated much publicity for Gibb and WKNR-FM. It was air personality Chris Randall who phoned WABC New York City DJ Roby Yonge.  Yonge put the rumor on the air in New York and was responsible for it spreading nationwide.

"Stereo Island" and transition to adult contemporary

WKNR-FM dropped its progressive rock format in 1971 to become "Stereo Island," a cross between Beautiful Music and Middle of the Road that could be described as an early form of what would be later be called Soft Adult Contemporary.  "Stereo Island" was successful and spawned imitators such as WFMK in Lansing, Michigan.  In 1972, both WKNR and WKNR-FM were sold and became WNIC-AM-FM, simulcasting a straightforward Beautiful Music format. The WNIC call letters were meant to denote the station's "NICe" music.  In 1976, WNIC adopted a more up-tempo sound called "Rock 'n' Easy", and moved to its current adult contemporary format. WNIC scored its first number-one placing in the monthly Arbitron ratings in Detroit in 1998.

Fresh 100.3, return to WNIC

On December 27, 2010, following its annual Christmas music programming and running a two-hour "music test" from 2:00 p.m. to 4:10 p.m. (running short snippets of songs from a variety of genres and advising listeners to poll them through the station's website; the last song before the "test" was "If It's Love" by Train), WNIC dropped its long-time mainstream AC format and shifted to Hot Adult Contemporary as Fresh 100.3; the first song as "Fresh" was "Raise Your Glass" by P!nk (by coincidence, one of the final songs polled in the "test").  Clear Channel's Detroit operations manager Todd Thomas stated that the new format was "the music that radio listeners in Detroit told us they wanted to hear", and "a unique sound on 100.3 for 2011 and beyond." The new format was competed primarily with WDVD.

In December 2011, WNIC began to backtrack on its format changes, reflected by the amended slogan "Variety From Today & Back In The Day". The station also adjusted its on-air lineup adding Billy The Kidd for nights.

On November 7, 2013 at Noon, after playing "Don't You (Forget About Me)" by Simple Minds, and coinciding with the start of the station's annual shift to all Christmas music, WNIC dropped the "Fresh" branding and reverted to 100.3 WNIC as its on-air brand. While the station continued with its more upbeat format, WNIC has added an increased amount of 1980s and 1990s music and occasionally a 1970s song.

WNIC, WOMC, and WDVD gained new competition from November 2018 to November 2020 with the flip of WDZH to Soft AC. Three Detroit radio stations now compete for the 25-54 female audience.

References

External links

Michiguide.com – WNIC History
Detroit Radio Ratings

NIC
Mainstream adult contemporary radio stations in the United States
IHeartMedia radio stations